One Night in Yoshiwara (German:Eine Nacht in Yoshiwara) is a 1928 German silent film directed by Emmerich Hanus and starring Alfred Abel, Barbara Dju and Rudolf Klein-Rogge.

Cast
 Alfred Abel 
 Barbara Dju 
 Rudolf Klein-Rogge

References

Bibliography
 Bock, Hans-Michael & Bergfelder, Tim. The Concise CineGraph. Encyclopedia of German Cinema. Berghahn Books, 2009.

External links

1928 films
Films of the Weimar Republic
Films directed by Emmerich Hanus
German silent feature films
German black-and-white films